William Humphreys was an English professional footballer who played as an inside right.

Career
Born in St Helens, Humphreys signed for Bradford City in September 1931 after playing minor football, leaving the club in 1932. During his time with Bradford City he made one appearance in the Football League.

Sources

References

Year of birth missing
Date of death missing
English footballers
Bradford City A.F.C. players
English Football League players
Association football inside forwards